Qieji Township (Mandarin: 切吉乡) is a township in Gonghe County, Hainan Tibetan Autonomous Prefecture, Qinghai, China. In 2010, Qieji Township had a total population of 8,948: 4,492 males and 2,456 females: 2,375 aged under 14, 6,233 aged between 15 and 65 and 340 aged over 65.

References 

Township-level divisions of Qinghai
Hainan Tibetan Autonomous Prefecture